Nassaria callomoni is a species of sea snail, a marine gastropod mollusk in the family Nassariidae, the true whelks.

Description

Distribution

References

External links

Nassariidae 
Gastropods described in 2008